Irene R. Mathyssen (born August 16, 1951) is a Canadian politician and was a Member of Parliament in the House of Commons of Canada from 2006 until 2019. She was previously a New Democratic Party Member of Provincial Parliament (MPP) in Ontario from 1990 to 1995, and briefly served as a minister in the government of Premier Bob Rae.

Background
Mathyssen was educated at the University of Western Ontario from 1970 to 1975, receiving a Bachelor of Arts degree in English and Drama, and a Bachelor of Education degree. She taught English at Saunders Secondary School in London, Ontario, until 2006 except for a five-year break between 1990 and 1995 when she was an MPP. She served on the District 11 Ontario Secondary School Teachers' Federation Political Action Committee. She was a vocal opponent of the Invasion of Iraq in 2003 and participated in many local peace rallies. Mathyssen was a member of the Ontario Health Coalition. She was president of the Middlesex NDP riding association from 1989 to 1990.

Provincial politics
She was elected to represent the riding of Middlesex in the Legislative Assembly of Ontario in the 1990 provincial election, defeating incumbent Liberal Doug Reycraft by 520 votes (out of 38,382 cast). She served as government Whip from 1990 to 1991, and was a parliamentary assistant to the Minister of the Environment from 1991 to 1994. In that capacity she announced that 6 million dollars would be spent on the cleanup of beaches in rural areas which were closed mostly due to agricultural runoff issues. In 1993, she voted against a government bill to allow a municipal expansion into her rural riding. During the debate she lamented about her lack of influence on the bill. She said, "There have been times when I felt utterly powerless in all of this. It's a strange feeling for one who came here with such high hopes."

On October 21, 1994, she was named a Minister without Portfolio, responsible for Culture, Tourism and Recreation.

The NDP was defeated by the Progressive Conservative Party in the 1995 provincial election, and Mathyssen was defeated in Middlesex, finishing third behind Reycraft and winner Progressive Conservative Bruce Smith.

She ran in the London—Fanshawe riding in the 1999 provincial election and placed third, behind PC candidate Frank Mazzilli and Liberal Peter Mancini. Mathyssen ran provincially in London—Fanshawe for a second time in the 2003 provincial election, and this time finished a strong second, losing to Liberal Khalil Ramal by fewer than 2,000 votes.

Federal politics
She ran for the federal New Democratic Party in the 1997 election, and finished third in the riding of London—Fanshawe, well behind Liberal incumbent Pat O'Brien. O'Brien won by more than 3,000 votes.

2006: Elected as MP
She again ran in London—Fanshawe in the 2006 election. Pat O'Brien had left the Liberal Party by this time, and sat out his remaining time in the House of Commons as an independent. He opted not to run in the 2006 election. Mathyssen won the riding with 34% of the vote, becoming one of 29 New Democrats elected.

During the session, she was named as the NDP critic for Housing and for the Status of Women. In November 2006, she tabled a Private member's bill which she called the Housing Bill of Rights which would have provided secure housing for Canadians. The bill got no further than first reading. A similar bill proposed by Libby Davies in 2004 also died on the order paper.

During a parliamentary session on December 5, 2007, Mathyssen committed a blunder when she stood in the Commons and accused Conservative James Moore of looking at images of "scantily clad" women on his personal laptop computer at his desk in the House of Commons. She openly questioned his integrity and said his actions "disrespected women". James Moore denied the allegations were true. Later in the day, Mathyssen and Moore spoke in person about the incident; Moore explained that the woman he had been looking at on his laptop computer screen was his girlfriend. Shortly after, Mathyssen retracted her statement and apologized to Moore.

2008: Re-elected
Mathyssen was re-elected as the Member of Parliament for London-Fanshawe in the 2008 federal election. In that election she was the only incumbent in the London region re-elected with increased total vote (17,672) and percentage of popular vote (43.1%). In addition to retaining her role as Status of Women critic, Mathyssen was also named the NDP's deputy critic for public safety, and in this role has been an advocate for Canadian firefighters. She also served as the NDP's deputy critic for Veterans' Affairs.

In December 2010, Mathyssen introduced Bill C-601, which allowed any worker who had lost their job through no fault of their own to make a single lump sum payment over the maximum allowable investment into their Registered Retirement Savings Plan (RRSP) without financial penalty. It also ensured that workers would receive the maximum amount of Employment Insurance benefits for which they are eligible; workers would be able to collect EI immediately despite receiving severance pay.

2011: Re-elected
In the 2011 election, Mathyssen was re-elected with 50% of the popular vote, defeating Conservative candidate Jim Chahbar by over 7,000 votes. She was named Official Opposition Critic for Seniors in the NDP’s shadow cabinet by Jack Layton.  Despite the tradition of committee chairs going to government MPs, she served as chair of the House of Commons Committee on the Status of Women.

On January 1, 2012, Caterpillar Inc. locked out over 450 workers from the Electro Motive Diesel plant in Mathyssen’s riding of London-Fanshawe.  Mathyssen was a vocal critic of the company’s actions and a strong supporter of the locked out workers.  After the company announced it was closing the plant on February 3, Mathyssen put forward a motion in the House of Commons to amend the Investment Canada Act to prevent companies from taking these actions in the future.

In October 2013, Mathyssen introduced Bill C-282 to eliminate the HST on feminine hygiene products. The idea gained popular grassroots support, with a group called Canadian Menstruators organizing an online petition that rapidly attracted tens of thousands of signatures from across Canada. Mathyssen took the lead in the House of Commons for an NDP Opposition Day, introducing a motion to force a vote on the issue. The governing Conservatives initially tried to stall the effort promising to revisit the idea in the future, without a clear timeline. Mathyssen would not relent however, and with more than 74,000 Canadians having signed the petition, the Conservatives, with pressure mounting from their own female MPs threatening to not show up for the vote, changed course at the last moment. With the backing of MPs from all political parties in the House of Commons, Mathyssen's motion passed and the tax was eliminated July 1, 2015.

2015: Re-elected 
In October 2015, Mathyssen was re-elected for another term in parliament. Despite a strong "Stop Harper" campaign that led to increased voter turnout and sent a wave of popular support to Justin Trudeau's Liberals at the expense of the NDP, Mathyssen not only held her seat in London-Fanshawe, but retained almost all of the 20,000+ votes she received in 2011. NDP leader Tom Mulcair named Mathyssen the party's Critic for Veterans Affairs and the deputy whip for the caucus.

In August 2018, Mathyssen announced that she would be retiring from politics and would not seek re-election in the 2019 federal election.

References

External links
 Irene Mathyssen (archived on March 19, 2018)
 
 

1951 births
Canadian people of Danish descent
Canadian people of Italian descent
Women members of the House of Commons of Canada
Living people
Members of the Executive Council of Ontario
Members of the House of Commons of Canada from Ontario
New Democratic Party MPs
Ontario New Democratic Party MPPs
Politicians from London, Ontario
University of Western Ontario alumni
Women MPPs in Ontario
21st-century Canadian politicians
21st-century Canadian women politicians
Women government ministers of Canada